The year 2005 is the 5th year in the history of the Maximum Fighting Championship, a mixed martial arts promotion based in Canada. In 2005 Maximum Fighting Championship held 1 event, MFC 8: Resurrection.

Events list

MFC 8: Resurrection

MFC 8: Resurrection was an event held on September 9, 2005 at the Shaw Conference Centre in Edmonton, Alberta, Canada.

Results

See also 
 Maximum Fighting Championship
 List of Maximum Fighting Championship events

References

Maximum Fighting Championship events
2005 in mixed martial arts
Events in Edmonton